KAJR-LD, virtual channel 36 (UHF digital channel 21), is a television station serving Des Moines, Iowa, United States that is licensed to Fort Dodge. The station is owned by HC2 Holdings, as part of a duopoly with KCYM-LD (channel 45). The station broadcasts its digital signal on from a transmitter located near Baxter.

History 
The station’s construction permit was issued on October 10, 2012, under the calls of K36MR-D, which was then changed to KAJR-LD.

Digital channels
The station's signal is multiplexed:

References

External links
DTV America

Low-power television stations in the United States
Innovate Corp.
Television channels and stations established in 2016
AJR-LD